Robert Anderson Van Wyck (July 20, 1849November 14, 1918) was the first mayor of New York City after the consolidation of the five boroughs into the City of Greater New York in 1898.

Early life and education
Robert Anderson Van Wyck was the son of William Van Wyck and Lydia Ann Maverick. He was one of seven children, including two brothers Augustus and Samuel Maverick, a Confederate Regimental Surgeon.  He studied at the Wilson Academy in North Carolina, and later graduated from Columbia University, where he was valedictorian of his class. His sister Lydia married Robert Hoke of North Carolina, a Confederate general during the American Civil War and businessman.

Career
Van Wyck began working in business, then studied law and became an attorney. He enjoyed a large practice for many years before entering politics.

His business life depended on his social connections as well. Van Wyck was a member of the Holland Society, of which he became president. He belonged to many of the social clubs of the city and was prominent in Masonic circles, being a member of The Ancient Lodge, New York City.

Political career
For many years Van Wyck took an active interest in Democratic Party matters, attending many conventions, state and national. Later, Van Wyck was elected Judge of the City Court of New York. He advanced to chief justice.

Van Wyck resigned as justice to accept the Democratic Party nomination for Mayor of New York City.  He was elected in 1897 by a very large majority.  He served as mayor of New York City between 1898 and 1901, as the first mayor to govern New York City after its five boroughs had been consolidated into a single city.

As Mayor, he brought together the innumerable municipal corporations comprising the greater city, adjusting their finances and bringing order out of almost total chaos. He directed construction of the Interborough Rapid Transit, the first subway in Manhattan, and provided for the construction of the proposed Brooklyn Tunnel.

Van Wyck is generally regarded as a colorless mayor, selected by the leaders of Tammany Hall as a man who would do little to interfere with their running of the city. Initially highly popular as a result of his reversal of the various reforms introduced by the preceding Fusion administration, Van Wyck's administration foundered on the so-called 'Ice Trust' scandal of 1900. The New York World reported that the American Ice Company of Charles W. Morse planned to double the price of ice, from 30 to 60 cents per hundred pounds (from 66 cents to 1.32 dollars per 100 kilograms). In the era before refrigeration, this had potentially fatal effects, as the ice was the only preservative available to keep food, milk, and medicines fresh. The high price would have put ice beyond the reach of many of the city's poorTammany's main power base in the years of waves of immigration.

American Ice was forced to reverse its decision due to the public outcry. Van Wyck's political rivals forced an investigation into the issue. It revealed that American Ice had secured an effective monopoly over the supply of its product to the cityit was the only company with rights to land ice at New York piersand would have dramatically increased its profits at the new price. In addition, Van Wyck, whose salary as mayor was only $15,000, owned and had apparently not paid for, $680,000 worth of American Ice stock.

The Ice Trust Scandal destroyed Van Wyck's political career and was generally reckoned to have cost Tammany the elections of 1901, which was won by the Fusion reformist slate led by Seth Low. Two years later, the New York Times characterized the Van Wyck administration as one mired in "black ooze and slime". Governor Theodore Roosevelt initiated an investigation, which determined that Van Wyck had not been personally implicated in the Ice Trust Scandal.

Later years
Van Wyck and his wife enjoyed traveling. In 1906, they moved to Paris, France. He died there at the age of 69 on November 14, 1918. The funeral was held at American Holy Trinity Church.  His body was returned to New York and he was buried at Woodlawn Cemetery in The Bronx, New York City.

Legacy
In 1898 the FDNY launched a fireboat named Robert Van Wyck.
MS 217 in Queens is the Robert A. Van Wyck Middle School
The Jamaica–Van Wyck station of the New York City Subway in Queens
The Van Wyck Expressway runs in a north-south direction through Queens from John F. Kennedy International Airport in the south to the Whitestone Expressway in the north.

References

Further reading
Anne Van Wyck, Descendants of Cornelius Barentse Van Wyck and Anna Polhemus, New York: Tobias A. Wright Printer and Publisher, 1912, pp. 207–208.
 Oliver Allen (1993). The Tiger: The Rise and Fall of Tammany Hall, New York: Addison Wesley.
 New York Times, 4 November 1903.
 New York Times, 16 November 1918.
 New York Times, 4 January 1919.

External links

1849 births
1918 deaths
19th-century American politicians
20th-century American politicians
American expatriates in France
American people of Dutch descent
Burials at Woodlawn Cemetery (Bronx, New York)
Columbia College (New York) alumni
Ice trade
Mayors of New York City
New York (state) Democrats
New York (state) lawyers
New York (state) state court judges
Robert Anderson
19th-century American judges
19th-century American lawyers